The Hum, the third album by the folk music duo O'Hooley & Tidow, was released on 17 February 2014 and received four-starred reviews in The Guardian and The Irish Times. Inspired by the sights and sounds of the Colne Valley, it has been described as "a collection of songs paying homage to the West Riding village of Golcar", the former industrial village in the West Riding of Yorkshire where Belinda O'Hooley and Heidi Tidow share a home together.

Production
The vocals, piano, electric piano and accordion on the album were recorded in Golcar, Huddersfield, by Belinda O'Hooley, Heidi Tidow and Neil Ferguson of Chumbawamba. The other instruments were arranged, performed and recorded at Tunehouse Studio, London, by Gerry Diver. The album was mixed and produced by Gerry Diver at Tunehouse Studio, London.

Release
The album was released on 17 February 2014 on the No Masters label. Two songs from the album – "Summat's Brewin'" and "Peculiar Brood" – were released as a single on 20 July 2014. A live version of "Summat's Brewin'" was released in August 2015 on their album of the same name.

On 7 September 2014 O'Hooley & Tidow released a video of a live performance of "Peculiar Brood", a portrayal of suicide bombing from a mother’s perspective, using bird imagery. It was filmed by Minster Studios at Holy Trinity Church, Leeds.

Reception
The Hum received a four-starred review in The Irish Times.

In a four-starred review in The Guardian, Robin Denselow described it as the duo's most experimental album to date, with  "thoughtful, inventive songs about industry, migrant workers and war alongside a sturdy tribute to Pussy Riot; an exquisite lament about motherhood and sacrifice; a mystical love story about a fox who becomes a woman, and a haunting treatment of Ruins By the Shore, the Nic Jones song of time and decay. Surely one of the albums of the year".

Personnel
O'Hooley & Tidow
 Belinda O'Hooley – vocals, piano, electric piano, accordion
 Heidi Tidow – vocals

Additional musicians
 Gerry Diver – fiddle & string section, tenor and bass guitars, pedal steel, bouzouki, Fender Rhodes, autoharp, drums, percussion, programming

Track listing

   "The Hum" (4.02)
   "Just a Note" (3.02)
   "Summat's Brewin'" (3.10)
   "Two Mothers" (5.48)
   "Peculiar Brood" (3.10)
   "Like Horses" (4.35)
   "Come Down from the Moor" (4.56)
   "Coil & Spring" (3.56)
   "Ruins By the Shore" (4.17)
   "Kitsune" (6.05)

References

External links
 Official website: O'Hooley & Tidow
 Lyrics of the album's title track

2014 albums
Colne Valley
O'Hooley & Tidow albums